The National Eligibility cum Entrance Test (Postgraduate) (or NEET (PG)) is a qualifying and ranking examination in India, for students who wish to study various postgraduate Doctor of Medicine (MD), Master of Surgery (MS) and diploma courses, in government or private medical colleges in the country. This exam replaced All India Post Graduate Medical Entrance Examination (AIPGMEE).

The exam is conducted by the National Board of Examinations (NBE). The counselling and seat allotment is conducted by Directorate General of Health Services (DGHS).

Eligibility criteria 
Candidates studying in India, having Bachelor of Medicine, Bachelor of Surgery (MBBS) degree or provisional MBBS pass certificate as per Indian Medical Council Act, and MBBS registration certificate issued by the Indian or state medical council and have completed one year of internship or will be completing the internship, are eligible to apply for the exam.

The candidates having Indian citizenship, but have graduated from any foreign medical college, should qualify the Medical Council of India Screening Test (also called Foreign Medical Graduate Examination). They also need to be registered with Indian or state medical council and have completed one year of internship or will be completing the internship.

For foreign nationals, registration is necessary from the country they have obtained basic medical qualification. Medical Council of India (MCI) registration is not compulsory. Temporary registration might be given on payment of application fees.

Organising body 
The exam is conducted by National Board of Examinations, an autonomous organisation of Ministry of Health and Family Welfare, Government of India. It also conducts exams other National Eligibility cum Entrance Test for Super Specialty courses (SS) and Master of Dental Surgery (MDS).

Exam pattern and structure 
The examination is computer based, consisting of 200 mcqs multiple choice questions (MCQ) with single response. The language is English only. It is held in 162 test centres across India. For each correct response, four marks are allotted and for each wrong response one mark (25 percent) is deducted. No marks awarded or deducted for an unattempted question. There is an option to mark questions for review whether attempted or unattempted, to check them until the exam ends.

Syllabus 
The syllabus comprises subjects prescribed by the Graduate Medical Education Regulations issued by Medical Council of India. It includes anatomy, physiology, biochemistry, pathology, pharmacology, microbiology, forensic medicine, social and preventive medicine, general medicine, general surgery, obstetrics and gynaecology, paediatrics, otorhinolaryngology and ophthalmology ,  Dermatology ,  Anesthesiology ,  Radiology ,  Psychiatry ,  Orthopaedics

Application fees 
The application process is completely online.

Cutoff and Results 
The cutoff marks in the exam is divided into four categories based on the groups  of people and castes in India. Cutoffs were reduced in 2020. For General candidates it is 30th percentile, for general but PwD candidates it is a25th percentile, for both SC/ST/OBC and PwD under SC/ST/OBC, it is 20th percentile.

The results of the exam is valid for current admission session, i.e. one year. It can not be carried forward for the next session.

Seat allotment 
The whole seat pool for Diploma, MD and MS is divided into half. One for medical institutes under central government (which is the all India 50 percent quota) and the rest half for all the respective state medical councils. Seat allotment is done through a centralised counselling procedure. For all India quota it is conducted by DGHS. Merit list of qualified students is prepared based on score and percentile. Seats are reserved for the SC, ST, PwD and non-creamy layer OBC  candidates, which is 15, 7.5, 5 and 27 percent respectively. Wherever Economically Weaker Section (EWS) quota is implemented, 10 percent seats will be reserved for them. Eligibility and other criteria are different in case of Armed Forces Medical Services institutions. There is no reservation in Armed Forces Medical Service Institutions.

Institutes 
114 medical colleges and institutes, both government and private, take admission through this exam.

Institutes not covered by the exam 
5 INIs(Institute of National Importance) are exempted from centralised admission via this exam. They are:

 All India Institutes of Medical Sciences (AIIMSs)
 Postgraduate Institute of Medical Education and Research (PGIMER)
 Jawaharlal Institute of Postgraduate Medical Education and Research (JIPMER)
 National Institute of Mental Health and Neurosciences (NIMHANS)
 Sree Chitra Tirunal Institute for Medical Sciences and Technology (SCTIMST)
Admission to these institutes is via another entrance test i.e. INI-CET.

Number of applicants 
In 2020, 167,102 candidates registered for the exam, 18,389 more than the previous year. 166,702 candidates were Indian citizens, 16 were Non-Resident of India, 130 Person of Indian Origin and 254 foreigners. 160,888 candidates appeared for the exam and, out  of which 89,549 qualified. 12 were declared ineligible.

DNB courses 
The exam is also used for admission into various Diplomate of National Board (DNB) courses. No other entrance exam is held for it. The eligibility criteria are same as that of PG courses. Reservation in DNB courses is determined by the institution.

Controversies

NEET (PG) 2021 
The exam is generally held in December-January but in 2021 it was postponed due to the COVID-19 pandemic and was held in September 2021. However, counselling for students who appeared for the exam has not been conducted yet because of cases pending in the Supreme Court over reservations to the economically weaker section. The delay in counselling has resulted in shortage of doctors at hospitals, increasing workload for existing resident doctors. Protests over the delay in counselling began on November 27 with resident doctors boycotting work in out patient departments which gradually escalated to “withdrawal from all service”. The boycott was suspended on December 9 after the doctors were given assurances that the counselling schedule will be released in a week, but they resumed the boycott from December 17 as the government failed to act on those assurances. On 27 December 2021, resident doctors that were marching towards the Supreme Court were stopped and “brutally thrashed, dragged, and detained” by the Delhi Police according to FORDA, an association of resident doctors.

See also 

 National Eligibility cum Entrance Test (UG)
 National Board of Examinations
 National Exit Test
 Medical colleges in India

References

External links 
 National Board of Examinations

Medical education in India
Standardised tests in India
2013 establishments in India